"Baby Turns Blue" is a single by the Irish post-punk band Virgin Prunes, released on 9 October 1982 by Rough Trade Records. The remixed 12" version was retitled The Faculties of a Broken Heart.

Formats and track listing 
All songs written by the Virgin Prunes

UK 7" single (RT 119)
"Baby Turns Blue" – 3:43
"Yeo" – 2:17

UK 12" single (RT 119T)
"The Faculties of a Broken Heart (What Should We Do If Baby Turns Blue)" 
"Chance of a Lifetime" 
"Yeo"

Personnel 

Virgin Prunes
 Mary D'Nellon – drums
 Dik Evans – guitar
 Gavin Friday – vocals
 Guggi – vocals
 Strongman – bass guitar

Technical personnel
 Kevin Maloney – engineering
 Colin Newman – production
 Steve Parker – engineering
 Virgin Prunes – production
 The Yeomen – production (B-side)

Charts

References

External links
 

1982 songs
1982 singles
Rough Trade Records singles
Virgin Prunes songs